is a puzzle video game software developed and published by Nintendo for the Game Boy Advance.  It was released only in Japan on March 8, 2002. It is the first Game Boy Advance title that uses a tilt-sensor chip.

Gameplay 
In Koro Koro Puzzle Happy Panechu!, the basic strategy is to first fill the screen with colored blocks called Panechus and then make them disappear by making a group of Panechus in one color come together to fill up the bomb meter. Then combine the bombs into mega bombs to blow up the screen big time. The bomb meter is the blue dotted field in the bottom right. When you make Panechus disappear, you get black spots in this field, which will be turned into bombs the next time you press A. Try to make long combos for higher bomb scores. A combo is when you make Panechus disappear in a row without interruption. You can hear how good you're doing by the shouts from the Panechus as they disappear. For some instances, a 1 combo will make them say "HAPPY", a 2+ combo will make them say "SO HAPPY", a 6+ combo will make them say "MEGA HAPPY" and so on. You can see at the top of the bomb meter how many bonus bomb points you get (1+, 2+, 3+, 5+ etc.). If the field gets filled up a "DANGER!!" alert will come up, and you get 10 seconds to clear things up or it is game over.

Modes 
There are five different play modes to choose from.
 Block Battle – Set off bombs to send blocks to the AI opponents screen. The first one to get a completely cluttered screen loses. The left side will show you the opponent's status.
 Knock-Out Game – Blow up bombs next to the enemy platform in the middle to harm him, bigger bombs means more harm. The status bar to the left shows how much energy the enemy got left. The enemy will send magic blocks into the playing field to hinder you.
 IQ Puzzles – Clear the screen of Panechus in the least possible number of moves. Any panechus left on the screen and you lose. Unlike the other modes you can't make more Panechus appear with the A button and there are no bombs or bomb meter.
 High Score Game – Gather as many points as possible in the set time by blowing up big bombs.
 Time Challenge – Clear the screen in as short time as possible. The top right meter ticks up, when it fills, new blocks falls onto the screen.

Items 

 Panechus – The cute little creatures with big lips. They come in four colors: pink, yellow, blue and green. When three or more of them in the same color come together, they vanish.
 Bombs – These black objects are important in the game. When they get together they stick to each other. Two or more sticking together can be blown up with the B button, erasing blocks or hurting enemies. Stick four up in a square to make a big bomb, stick two big bombs together to make an even bigger bomb, and two of those will get you the largest bomb to create. Bigger bombs means more firepower.
 Hindering Blocks (Grey) – These are mainly in the way. They can be single blocks, or longer rows. They don't stick together, and you can blow them up with bombs. The bombs need to touch the block directly to blow it up.
 Magic Blocks (Transparent) – These are pretty much the same as the Hindering Blocks, except they are nice and transparent looking. These only appear in the Knock-Out mode.
 Diamonds – These are rare objects. When blown up with the B button, they make all blocks on screen vanish. You can make them appear by shutting a Panechu up inside a big bomb  (make a 3×3 bomb with a Panechu in the middle).
 IQ Mode Blocks – There are three kinds of blocks in this mode: IQ-Panechu (Big nose), which works like a normal Panechu; Wall Block (Nostrils), which forms a rigid block when stuck together; and IQ-Hinder Block (Grey Sleeping), which gets in the way.

Reversing the Tilt Sensor 
It is possible to reverse the tilt sensor to be able to properly play it on a GBA SP.

In the menu, go to "option" (rightmost green panechu) then choose the blue "tilt sensitivity" one.
On this screen, press and hold first UP, then L, then R, and finally B.
After this, you should get a confirmation message accompanied by a little chime.

You might want to reconfigure your sensitivity back to where it was since pressing up changed it.

References

External links 
Japanese Official Nintendo website

2002 video games
Game Boy Advance games
Game Boy Advance-only games
Puzzle video games
Nintendo games
Japan-exclusive video games
Video games developed in Japan